Vindula, commonly called cruisers, is a genus of butterflies of the subfamily Heliconiinae in the family Nymphalidae found in southeast Asia and Australia. These butterflies are dimorphic.

Species
Ordered alphabetically:
 Vindula arsinoe (Cramer, 1777) – cruiser
 Vindula dejone (Erichson, 1834) – Malay cruiser, lesser cruiser
 Vindula erota (Fabricius, 1793) – common cruiser
 Vindula sapor (Godman & Salvin, 1888)

References

External links

Vindula at Tree of life
Images representing Vindula at Consortium for the Barcode of Life

Vagrantini
Nymphalidae genera
Taxa named by Francis Hemming